Lake Marcel is a private reservoir and community in unincorporated Carnation, Lake Marcel-Stillwater, King County, Washington, United States, in the foothills of the Cascades.

The lake sits in a bowl at the top of Stillwater Hill on the east side of the Snoqualmie Valley, north of Carnation. It has two main areas of water connected by a channel, and several peninsular features make an extensive shoreline around the lake.

Watershed
According to the Lake Marcel Community Club, there are "six identifiable inlet streams flowing into the lake; the largest one, Stillwater Creek, originates about 1.5 miles to the north." Lake Marcel is drained solely by Stillwater Creek, named for the historic community downstream at the base of Stillwater Hill. Near Stillwater, the creek briefly joins Harris Creek before meeting the Snoqualmie River in an area protected by the  Stillwater Wildlife Area, owned by the Washington State Department of Fish and Wildlife. The  Stillwater Natural Area, owned by King County, is adjacent. The portion of Stillwater Creek below Lake Marcel is also labeled as Essency Creek on some maps and government databases.

History
Originally a beaver pond, the lake and surrounding acreage was residentially developed in the early 1960s by Pyramid Investment Company of Bellevue, Washington. An island at the north end of the lake was formed by bulldozing during the excavation of the lake. A concrete-lined fish ladder for the inflow from Stillwater Creek was built around 1963. An earthen dam was completed in 1964.

Community growth
In 1985, Duvall-King County Fire District #45 built the Lake Marcel Fire Station, now a vehicle station for King County Water District #119.

In 1989, Riverview School District #407 opened Stillwater Elementary School—named after the historic Stillwater School—close to Lake Marcel. It is the district's only public school in an unincorporated area.

Dam
A concrete dam engineered by the United States Army Corps of Engineers was built in the 1980s by the Lake Marcel Community Club (LMCC) to replace the earthen dam.

The Lake Marcel Dam is regulated by the Washington State Department of Ecology and is privately owned by members of the LMCC. It is the only dam in Carnation, according to the Inventory of Dams in the State of Washington.

Comparison to other dams in the area

Population
The Lake Marcel-Stillwater census-designated place (CDP) represents the immediate area around Lake Marcel. It is the only CDP between Carnation and Duvall.

The Lake Marcel-Stillwater CDP is similar in size to Carnation and Fall City, both in the Snoqualmie Valley.

Homeowners Association
The Lake Marcel Community Club enforces regulations on the properties within its area of Plat and Dedication recognized by King County. LMCC maintains the dam, fish ladder, and 2 private beaches.

References

Marcel
Marcel
Buildings and structures in King County, Washington
Protected areas of King County, Washington
Marcel